This is a list of contestants who have appeared on The Amazing Race Philippines, a Philippine reality game show based on the American series, The Amazing Race. A total of 44 contestants have appeared in the series.

Contestants

Gallery

See also
List of The Amazing Race Philippines winners

References

Amazing Race Philippines contestants, The